is a three episode anime OVA by Japanese director Yoshiyuki Tomino.

Plot
The protagonist Chris is abruptly whisked away to a parallel world called Byston Well while his physical body remains in his home world. Chris' spiritual manifestation travels to a new world, where he is thrust into a rebellion. Chris is told that he has a mystical power called "Garzey's wing", which causes large wings made of light to come out of his ankles, allowing him to fly and run quickly.

Chris is told to fight against slave owners and the King's army as the slaves of the Metomeus tribe make their escape from the palace at Izumido. The Ashigaba army fights back with horses, bows, and dinosaur-like creatures called War Beasts. The series centers around the slave's escape, the conflict between the King's army and the slaves, as well as Chris' struggle to make sense of his convoluted situation.

Chris exists simultaneously in Byston Well and the real world, and the two can communicate to each other through a necklace they both wear. Real-world Chris feels the bruises and pain Byston Well Chris experiences while fighting soldiers, and training he does in the real world allow him to learn it in Byston Well. While one Chris is in Byston Well surrounded by 12th and 13th century foreigners and being chased by a real army, earth Chris must do Chi exercises to strengthen his mind.

In the end, Chris fights off the army and saves Byston Well, but his spirit remains there. Meanwhile, in the real world Chris has gained the power of Garzey's wing himself.

Characters
Christopher Senshu
Chris is the main character in the film. The story is based around him and his adventures in Byston Well. He is depicted as a regular half Japanese, half American boy who is trying to get into college but has already failed the college entrance exams twice now. He can turn into Garzey's Wing when he or someone that he cares about is in grave danger.
Rumiko Nakato
A close personal friend of Chris who helps him get through the rough times as he is fighting in Byston Well.
King Fungun
The ruthless king, who lives in a palace in the city of Izumido, which was built on the backs of the countless slaves he has. Aware of the great powers of the Baraju Tree, King Fungun lets the slaves escape in hopes that they will lead him to the tree, where he then will be able to take it over from the Metomeus by force.
Zagazoa
General of the War beast army corps. Came back to assist the King after he caught wind of the attack while fighting the savage Western tribe.
Gelgog Aji
General of the Ashigaba who dies when a limestone cave collapses. He had a scruffy beard and shoulder length brown hair.
Leelince
A female warrior among the slaves. She takes a position of semi-leadership in the escape. She is able make contact with a hooded figure who is a valuable fighter for the cause. She also exemplifies an attitude of jealously towards the relationship between Chris and Hassan-san. She is able to overcome her jealousy through a single shot of her shown in inversed colours in episode 3.
Hassan
The priestess who is able to summon Chris to Bryston Well, using the eight Earthenware bells made from special blue clay. It is questioned how such a devious mind can hide in such innocent beauty. A more serious indictment comes from the general of the war beasts when he accuses Hassan-san of being a fake maiden. Whether or not these claims have any backing has the potential to tarnish an otherwise wholesome reputation.
Aishe and Tance
Aishe (pink hair), and Tance (green hair), are Hassan's children. They assist her with spiritual activities.
Ketta Keras
Supreme Commander of the Metomeus.
Philocres
Ketta Keras' loyal advisor. Often dispenses useful but somewhat cynical information. Initially displays an aversion to Falan Fa.
Chifchi
A Metomeus lieutenant.
Domon
A Metomeus lieutenant. Leader of the suicide squad.
Giant Tawrad
Leelince finds Giant Tawrad and he is able to come to the rescue of the Metomeus when all hope seems lost. He comes and goes in the later part of the series, fighting the war beasts because, like many other people, he is morally dissatisfied by the dictatorship in Byston Well. It is pointed out that he has distinctive facial features which are often associated with the Garode tribe in the North.
Ondel
Food gatherer leader for the Metomeus.
Kurino
Hassan's assistant. Covers the bells so they can bake, and provides firewood.
Sechuku
Hassan's guard.
Lord Tawazzan
He helps with Chris's inventions and has a bowl cut.
Chris' other friends
Chris' other friends show a true, genuine sense of friendship towards Chris. It is evident when they believe Chris and don't even question the possibility that Chris might be going crazy when he starts to feel sick and begins communicating with the Chris in Byston Well. One who is specifically named is Ms. Tarsier
Falan Fa
The only Ferario depicted throughout the story, who guides Chris as he adapts to his new world. She is introduced when she gets tangled up in Chris's necklace as he is moving between the real world and Byston Well. She also provide sound advice to Chris and the others when faced with perilous situations.
Daragau
These are the most feared of the War Beasts, because of the size, and vicious nature. They are about 30–35 feet tall, mainly brown and Grey, with a large orange spike on their head to use in battle.
Dragorol
Reptilian creatures found in the Boundless Plains of Gabujuju.
Bandou-ran
Smaller pink creatures used by the War Beast Army Corps. to carry single soldiers into close combat situations. Their descriptions are similar to those of dinosaurs commonly known as raptors.

Cast

Theme Songs
WINGS OF MY HEART (Ending Theme)
Performance: Magesty  
Lyrics: Shiro Sagisu
Composer/Arranger: Shiro Sagisu

Related
 Aura Battler Dunbine and its sequel OVA also occur in the fictional land of Byston Well (technically, many centuries in the past; the chronologies of ABD and this anime do not match up).

References

External links
 Anime News Network: Buried Garbage - Garzey's Wing
 EX (review and info)
 

1996 anime OVAs
Central Park Media
Isekai anime and manga
J.C.Staff
OVAs composed by Shirō Sagisu
Sword and sorcery anime and manga